Miss Venezuela 1987 was the 34th Miss Venezuela pageant, was held in Caracas, Venezuela on February 6, 1987, after weeks of events.  The winner of the pageant was Inés María Calero, Miss Nueva Esparta.

The pageant was broadcast live on Venevision from the Teatro Municipal in Caracas. At the conclusion of the final night of competition, outgoing titleholder Bárbara Palacios, Miss Venezuela 1986 and Miss Universe 1986, crowned Inés María Calero of Nueva Esparta as the new Miss Venezuela.

Results
Miss Venezuela 1987 - Inés María Calero (Miss Nueva Esparta)
Miss World Venezuela 1987 - Albany Lozada (Miss Portuguesa) 
Miss Venezuela International 1987 - Vicky García (Miss Municipio Libertador) 

The runners-up were:
1st runner-up - Isabella Rueda (Miss Bolívar)
2nd runner-up - Viviana Gibelli (Miss Monagas)
3rd runner-up - Cora Ruiz (Miss Distrito Federal)
4th runner-up - Maria Elena Useche (Miss Anzoátegui)
5th runner-up - Bonny Rey (Miss Barinas)

Special awards
 Miss Photogenic (voted by press reporters) - Inés María Calero (Miss Nueva Esparta)
 Miss Congeniality - Panny Levay (Miss Carabobo)
 Miss Elegance - Claudia Fazzini (Miss Falcón)

Delegates
The Miss Venezuela 1987 delegates are:

Miss Anzoátegui - Maria Elena Useche Zambrano
Miss Apure - Zaida Luz Mujica Ramírez
Miss Aragua - Liliana Velo Obrero
Miss Barinas - Maribel Bonny Rey 
Miss Bolívar - Isabella Fátima Rueda Acosta
Miss Carabobo - Panny Levay Jeney 
Miss Cojedes -  Yelitza Ayala Padilla
Miss Dependencias Federales - Lourdes Yánez León
Miss Distrito Federal - Corabel (Cora) Ruiz Lares
Miss Falcón - Claudia Anne Fazzini Adrianza
Miss Guárico - Maria Carolina González Crestin
Miss Lara - Mónica Figueredo Do Dourado
Miss Mérida - Ingrid Betsaida Villasana De Jesús
Miss Miranda - Ludmila Padrino Rojas
Miss Monagas - Viviana Agueda Gibelli Gómez
Miss Municipio Libertador - Begoña Victoria (Vicky) García Varas
Miss Municipio Vargas - Allison Alí Osuna
Miss Nueva Esparta - Inés Maria Calero Rodríguez
Miss Portuguesa - Albani Josefina Lozada Jiménez
Miss Sucre - Adriana Faillace Evangelista
Miss Trujillo - Anabelli Espina Perdomo
Miss Yaracuy - Karem Frydland García
Miss Zulia - Claudia Ada Magno Fuenmayor

External links
Miss Venezuela official website

1987 beauty pageants
1987 in Venezuela
February 1987 events in South America